Marcelo Ribeiro Cabo (born 6 December 1966), known as Marcelo Cabo, is a Brazilian professional football coach, currently in charge of Remo.

Career
Born in Rio de Janeiro, Cabo played as a defensive midfielder, representing Fluminense, Vasco da Gama, Portuguesa-RJ and Olaria as a youth. He subsequently switched to futsal, notably representing Valencia CF.

In 1998, while at Fluminense's futsal team, Cabo retired and immediately became the side's trainer. He moved to Olaria in the following year, being also in charge of the club's football youth squads.

In 2003, Cabo was in charge of Madureira's under-20 team, whilst also taking over Flamengo's futsal team. In December of that year, he was named head coach of Bangu.

Cabo was in charge for 13 official matches, achieving only one win and suffering relegation from the 2004 Campeonato Carioca.

Cabo moved abroad in late 2004, taking over Al-Hilal's under-17 side. In the following year, he was named Marcos Paquetá's assistant at the helm of Saudi Arabia national team, and took part of the 2006 FIFA World Cup.

Upon returning to Brazil, Cabo coached Cabofriense and Bonsucesso during the 2007 campaign. In 2008 he took over CFZ do Rio, and moved to Atlético Tubarão late in the year after a partnership with his previous club CFZ was established; he returned to Tubarão on 15 December 2008, but left the following 5 February.

On 29 July 2009, Cabo took over Kuwait's Al-Nasr. He also acted as Dunga's technical scout during the 2010 FIFA World Cup, and later joined Jorginho (Dunga's assistant during the World Cup) at Goiás and Figueirense.

In 2012, Cabo managed Emirati side Dibba Al-Fujairah, being sacked on 23 October of that year. On 16 December, he was appointed head coach of Tombense, but resigned on 9 May 2013.

On 28 January 2014, after another work as Jorginho's assistant (at Ponte Preta), Cabo was named in charge of Nacional de Nova Serrana. He later joined Jorginho's staff at Al Wasl, again as an assistant, staying for six months before being presented at Volta Redonda on 1 December 2014.

On 23 March 2015, Cabo resigned from Volta Redonda and took over Macaé Esporte. On 3 August, he departed from the latter club and was named at the helm of Ceará, but was subsequently replaced by Lisca.

On 8 October 2015, Cabo was appointed head coach of Tigres do Brasil for the 2016 season. He resigned from the club the following 27 February, and took over Resende on 2 March.

On 8 May 2016, Cabo was presented at Atlético Goianiense. He managed to achieve promotion to the Série A at the end of the year as champions, but in January 2017, he was reported missing in Goiânia for more than 40 hours. It was later revealed that he consumed too much alcoholic drinks and overslept in a motel.

Maintained in charge of the club after the occurrence, Cabo resigned on 5 June 2017, after four defeats in four league matches. He also managed Figueirense and Guarani in the remainder of the year, never lasting more than two months.

On 22 December 2017, Cabo returned to Resende, but left the club the following 18 February after accepting an offer from CSA. With the latter side he achieved top tier promotion, and renewed his contract on 29 November.

Cabo was fired from CSA on 30 June 2019, and was announced as new head coach of Vila Nova of the second level on 14 July. On 3 October, after only four wins in 17 matches, he was relieved of his duties; the club suffered relegation nonetheless.

Cabo was appointed in charge of second division side CRB on 12 October 2019. On 7 November of the following year, he left the club after accepting an offer from Atlético Goianiense in the top tier.

On 27 February 2021, hours after winning the 2020 Campeonato Goiano, Cabo was named head coach of Vasco da Gama, recently relegated to division two. He was sacked by the Cruzmaltino on 19 July, and took over fellow second division side Goiás the following day.

On 28 October 2021, despite being in the promotion places of the second division, Cabo was dismissed by Goiás. On 11 November, he returned to Atlético Goianiense for a third spell, but resigned on 7 February 2022, with only four matches into the new season.

On 10 February 2022, Cabo returned to CRB for a second spell as head coach. He left on 14 May, with the club in the last position of the second division, and took over fellow league team Chapecoense on 7 July.

On 30 August 2022, Cabo was sacked by Chape after only ten matches. On 24 October, he was announced in charge of Remo for the ensuing campaign.

Coaching statistics

Honours

Futsal
Olaria
 Campeonato Carioca de Futsal: 2002

Flamengo
 Campeonato Carioca de Futsal: 2003

Football
 Atlético Goianiense
 Campeonato Brasileiro Série B: 2016
 Campeonato Goiano: 2020

 CSA
 Campeonato Alagoano: 2018, 2019

 Vasco da Gama
 Taça Rio: 2021

 CRB
 Campeonato Alagoano: 2020, 2022

References

External links

1966 births
Living people
Sportspeople from Rio de Janeiro (city)
Brazilian football managers
Campeonato Brasileiro Série A managers
Campeonato Brasileiro Série B managers
Bangu Atlético Clube managers
Associação Desportiva Cabofriense managers
Bonsucesso Futebol Clube managers
Al-Arabi SC (Kuwait) managers
Tombense Futebol Clube managers
Volta Redonda Futebol Clube managers
Macaé Esporte Futebol Clube managers
Ceará Sporting Club managers
Esporte Clube Tigres do Brasil managers
Resende Futebol Clube managers
Atlético Clube Goianiense managers
Figueirense FC managers
Guarani FC managers
Centro Sportivo Alagoano managers
Vila Nova Futebol Clube managers
Clube de Regatas Brasil managers
Goiás Esporte Clube managers
Associação Chapecoense de Futebol managers
Clube do Remo managers
Brazilian expatriate football managers
Brazilian expatriate sportspeople in Saudi Arabia
Brazilian expatriate sportspeople in Kuwait
Brazilian expatriate sportspeople in the United Arab Emirates
Expatriate football managers in Saudi Arabia
Expatriate football managers in Kuwait
Expatriate football managers in the United Arab Emirates
Kuwait Premier League managers
Al-Nasr SC (Kuwait) managers